Pusillina kazakhstanica is an extinct species of fossil sea snail, a marine gastropod mollusk in the family Rissoidae.

This species of snail existed in what is now Kazakhstan during the Eocene period. It was described by O. V. Amitrov in 2010.

References

Rissoidae
Eocene gastropods